Marcel Heyninck (born 9 March 1931) is a Belgian water polo player. He competed in the men's tournament at the 1952 Summer Olympics.

References

1931 births
Living people
Belgian male water polo players
Olympic water polo players of Belgium
Water polo players at the 1952 Summer Olympics
Sportspeople from Antwerp